Mark Owen Pritchard (born 23 November 1985, in Tredegar) is a Welsh footballer who plays for Subiaco AFC

Career

Pritchard began his career at Swansea City, making his professional debut on 21 October 2003 during a 2–0 defeat to Cambridge United.

After a short spell on loan with Merthyr Tydfil at the end of the 2004–05 season, Swansea boss Kenny Jackett deemed him surplus to requirements at the Liberty Stadium and he was allowed to join Conference National side Aldershot Town, where he scored his first senior career goal during a 4–2 defeat to Blackpool in the FA Cup.

After a relatively successful two-year spell at Llanelli he was released by the club and joined local rivals, Carmarthen Town, in the summer of 2009. He left Carmarthen in 2010, spending a brief spell at Goytre United before joining Oxford City.

Pritchard moved to Western Australia in 2011 to link up with Floreat Athena. He won the clubs Fairest and Best award twice in three seasons and also represented the State against A-League side Perth Glory.

A switch for the 2014 season took Pritchard to Perth SC where he was a key feature of the starting eleven across two seasons. He transferred to Inglewood United for the 2016 National Premier Leagues season.

References

External links

Welsh Premier League profile

Living people
1985 births
Welsh footballers
Wales under-21 international footballers
Swansea City A.F.C. players
Merthyr Tydfil F.C. players
Aldershot Town F.C. players
Carmarthen Town A.F.C. players
Oxford City F.C. players
English Football League players
National League (English football) players
Cymru Premier players
National Premier Leagues players
Association football forwards
Goytre United F.C. players